District commissioner may refer to:

 District Commissioner (British Colonial), a rank in the British Colonial Service
 District Commissioner (film), a 1963 documentary film
District Commissioner (Malawi)
District Commissioner (Scouting)

See also
Deputy commissioner (India)